Shai Ben-David is an Israeli-Canadian computer scientist and professor at the University of Waterloo. He is known for his research in theoretical machine learning.

Biography 
Shai Ben-David grew up in Jerusalem, Israel and received a Ph.D. in mathematics from the Hebrew University of Jerusalem, where he was advised by Saharon Shelah. He held postdoctoral positions in mathematics and computer science at the University of Toronto. He was a professor of computer science at the Technion and also held visiting positions at the Australian National University and Cornell University.

He has been a professor of computer science at the University of Waterloo since 2004.

Selected publications and awards 
Ben-David has written highly cited papers on learning theory and online algorithms. He is a co-author, with Shai Shalev-Shwartz, of the book "Understanding Machine Learning: From Theory to Algorithms"(Cambridge University Press, 2014).

He received the best paper award at NeurIPS 2018. for work on sample complexity of distribution learning problems. He was the President of the Association for Computational Learning from 2009 to 2011.

References

External links 
 Home page at the University of Waterloo.
 Citations on Google Scholar.

Canadian computer scientists
Israeli computer scientists
Academic staff of the University of Waterloo
Date of birth missing (living people)
Year of birth missing (living people)
Living people
Hebrew University of Jerusalem alumni